Leuconitocris hintzi is a species of beetle in the family Cerambycidae. It was described by Per Olof Christopher Aurivillius in 1923, originally under the genus Nitocris.

Subspecies
 Dirphya hintzi hintzi (Aurivillius, 1923)
 Dirphya hintzi ituriensis Breuning, 1972

References

Leuconitocris
Beetles described in 1923